Marc Wilmet  (28 August 1938 – 10 November 2018) was a Belgian linguist and professor at the Université libre de Bruxelles. In 1986, he was awarded the Francqui Prize on Human Sciences.

See also
Conseil international de la langue française

References

External links
 Marc Wilmet (ULB)

1938 births
Belgian philologists
Academic staff of the Université libre de Bruxelles
Walloon movement activists
2018 deaths